Unirea National College is a magnet school in Brașov, Romania. It hosts gymnasium (5-8) and high school (9-12) classes.

History
 1883 - The land required for the construction of the school has been bought.
 1897 - The building was finished and the school was officially founded. It had two separate buildings - one for boys and one for girls. The two were joined by the gymnastics room forming a U-shaped building.
 1898-1899 - The first generation of students have joined the girls' school. It had 227 students that were studying in Hungarian.
 1914-1918 - The school's building hosted a military hospital and a prisoner's camp.
 1918 - Transylvania became a part of Romania and so the school became a girls' high school.
 1919, October 6 - The school had 8 classes (4 of primary education, and 4 of secondary education).
 1922 - The school was renamed "Elena Princess" High School.
 1928-1935 - High school had 8 classes instead of 4.
 1934 - One more story was added to the building.
 1941 - In the summer a hospital of the Romanian army was hosted in the school's building.
 1941-1948 - The school's classes were held at other high schools as the building was still a hospital.
 1948 - The school was renamed "Girls' High School"
 1956 - Boys and girls studied in this same school that was renamed "Medium Mix School #5 Brasov".
 1959 - The school was renamed "Unirea" after the historical event of the Union of Wallachia with Moldavia. The school united with the Hungarian High School.
 1990 - The union with the Hungarian High School ended.
 2005 - The school started hosting gymnasium classes (5-8) that had as a main objective the intensive learning of foreign languages.
 2004 - "Unirea" was awarded the title of "European School".
 2007 - The title of "European School" was renewed. The students of bilingual French classes could have a French school-leaving examination.

External links
 Official website 
 About "Unirea" on "Andrei Saguna" High School's official website 

Schools in Brașov
National Colleges in Romania
Educational institutions established in 1897
1897 establishments in Romania